The United States Virgin Islands' at-large congressional district encompasses the entire area of the U.S. Virgin Islands.  The territory does not have a voting member of Congress, but does elect a delegate who can participate in debates.

Since the Virgin Islands first held a delegate election in 1972, the voters of the territory have elected a Democrat on 23 occasions, a Republican once and an Independent once. In total, three Democrats, one Republican and one Independent (who caucused with Democrats) have represented the Virgin Islands in the U.S. Congress.

The current delegate is Democrat Stacey Plaskett.

List of delegates representing the district

Election results

References 

At-large
At-large United States congressional districts
 
congressional district
Constituencies established in 1970
1970 establishments in the United States Virgin Islands